Lycenchelys is a genus of marine ray-finned fishes belonging to the family Zoarcidae, the eelpouts. The genus has almost cosmopolitan distribution.

Taxonomy
The genus is classified in the subfamily Lycodinae, one of four subfamilies in the family Zoarcidae, the eelpouts.

Species
Lycenchelys contains the following species:

Etymology
Lycenchelys is a combination of lyc, a referencce to the genus Lycodes and  enchelys, the Greek word for "eel". i.e. similar to Lycodes but with a more elongated eel-like shape.

Characteristics
Lycenelchys are regarded as derived Lycodine eelpouts which are separated from other Lycodine genera by a number of oseological characters. They can be diagnosed by having between 6 and 10 suborbital bones and a cephalic sensory canal with between 6 and 10 pores. The pterygiophore of the first dorsal fin ray is associated with the second to the 21st vertebrae and there can be up to 16 free  pterygiophores, or there may be none. There is a weak series of palatopterygoids, a weak oral valve and pseudobranch. They may or may not have  pelvic  fins, vomerine teeth and palatine teeth. Scales, the pyloric caeca and lateral line or lines are all present.

Distribution and habitat
Lycenchelys is a cosmopolitan genus with species in all oceans, they are found in continental slope and abyssal habitats. They are rare or absent from the far northern Arctic, the eastern Atlantic and the tropical Indian Oceans.

References

Lycodinae
 
Taxa named by Theodore Gill